Indigenous rebellions in Mexico and Central America were conflicts of resistance initiated by indigenous peoples against European colonial empires and settler states that occurred in the territory of the continental Viceroyalty of New Spain and British Honduras, as well as their respective successor states. The latter include Mexico, Guatemala, Honduras, Belize, El Salvador, Nicaragua, Costa Rica, and parts of the Southern and Western United States.

Anti-colonial rebellions by the indigenous peoples of Central America had precedence in resistance to the Aztec Empire prior to the Spanish conquest. During the period of Spanish rule, forced labor, the expansion of colonial territory, and the forceful reduction of disparate communities into villages or missions where Christianity was enforced  were common causes of revolt. After independence, continued encroachment on indigenous land rights was the primary cause of conflict. Resistance has persisted into the 21st century, such as with the ongoing Zapatista uprising.

List of conflicts

References

Wars involving Spain
Wars involving Mexico
Wars involving Guatemala
Wars involving Honduras
Wars involving El Salvador
Wars involving Nicaragua
Wars involving Costa Rica
Wars involving Belize
Wars involving the United States
Wars involving the indigenous peoples of North America
Violence against indigenous peoples